Lukas Kiefer (born 25 April 1993) is a German footballer who plays as a midfielder for Oberliga Baden-Württemberg club Stuttgarter Kickers.

Club career

Kiefer joined VfB Stuttgart in 2004 and was promoted to the reserve team in 2012. He made his debut for the club in a 3-0 win against SpVgg Unterhaching coming as a substitute for Rani Khedira and scoring a goal in the 88th minute. He signed for 1. FC Saarbrücken at the end of the 2013–14 season.

International career
He was capped for Germany U16 3 times in 2008. He made his debut against Finland.

References

External links

1993 births
People from Böblingen
Sportspeople from Stuttgart (region)
Footballers from Baden-Württemberg
Living people
German footballers
Germany youth international footballers
Association football midfielders
VfB Stuttgart II players
1. FC Saarbrücken players
SV Waldhof Mannheim players
SSV Ulm 1846 players
Stuttgarter Kickers players
3. Liga players
Oberliga (football) players
Regionalliga players